LGA 7529 is an Intel Microprocessor compatible CPU socket that will be used by the future Sierra Forest, a line of All E-Core Xeon processors designed for heavily multithreaded cloud workloads, and Granite Rapids, the all P-Core mainstream Xeon microprocessors. The socket is also expected to support the mainstream successor to Granite Rapids, Diamond Rapids. The first pictures of the Intel 'Birch Stream' platform, a two socket engineering motherboard featuring dual LGA 7529 sockets, was posted on January 31st, 2023, by Yuuki_Ans.

The Birch Stream platform is expected to support 12 channels of DDR5 memory per socket, for a total of 24 channels of DDR5 memory on a dual socket system.

References

Intel CPU sockets